Porte d'Ivry is a station of the Paris Métro, serving Line 7 and Tramway Line 3a. It is named after the Porte d'Ivry, a gate in the nineteenth century Thiers wall of Paris on the road that led to Ivry-sur-Seine.

The station opened on 26 April, 1931, when Line 7 took over the Line 10 route from Place Monge to Porte de Choisy and was extended to Porte d'Ivry. Porte d'Ivry was the terminus of Tramway Line 3 when it opened on 16 December 2006. It was extended to Porte de Vincennes on 15 December 2012 and renamed 3a.

Station layout

Gallery

References

Paris Métro stations in the 13th arrondissement of Paris
Railway stations in France opened in 1931